China Cargo Airlines serves the following destinations (as of January 2013):

Asia

East Asia
 
 Hong Kong International Airport
 
 Osaka – Kansai International Airport
 Tokyo – Narita International Airport
 
 Beijing – Beijing Capital International Airport
 Chongqing – Chongqing Jiangbei International Airport
 Nanning – Nanning Wuxu International Airport
 Shanghai – Shanghai Pudong International Airport Hub
 Shenzhen – Shenzhen Bao'an International Airport
 Tianjin – Tianjin Binhai International Airport
 Xiamen – Xiamen Gaoqi International Airport
 
 Taipei – Taoyuan International Airport
 
 Seoul – Incheon International Airport

South Asia
 
 Dhaka – Shahjalal International Airport
 
 Chennai – Chennai International Airport

Southeast Asia
 
 Jakarta – Soekarno–Hatta International Airport
 
 Vientiane – Vientiane Airport
 
 Singapore – Changi Airport
 
 Bangkok – Suvarnabhumi International Airport

Europe

Northern Europe
 
 Copenhagen – Copenhagen Airport

Southern Europe
 
 Milan – Milan Malpensa Airport

Western Europe
 
 Paris – Charles de Gaulle Airport
 
 Amsterdam – Amsterdam Airport Schiphol
 
Frankfurt – Frankfurt Airport

North America
 
 Vancouver - Vancouver International Airport
 
 Anchorage – Ted Stevens Anchorage International Airport
 Atlanta – Hartsfield–Jackson Atlanta International Airport
 Chicago – O'Hare International Airport
 Dallas – Dallas/Fort Worth International Airport
 Los Angeles – Los Angeles International Airport
 Seattle - Seattle Tacoma International Airport

References

Lists of airline destinations